Richard Jones (born 22 October 1973) is a cricketer. He started well, captaining the New Zealand Under-19s cricket team in 1993/4. He went on to represent the full senior side in one Test match and five One Day Internationals.

Representing Auckland in a match against Wellington, he scored a century – the day before his wedding to Kelly Herbert. He was also the captain of the Auckland Aces, and played for the North Harbour cricket team in the Hawke Cup. In February 2001, he took a wicket with his one and only delivery in a first-class cricket match.

See also
 One-Test wonder

References

External links

 

1973 births
Living people
Auckland cricketers
New Zealand One Day International cricketers
New Zealand Test cricketers
New Zealand Youth One Day International captains
New Zealand Youth Test captains
New Zealand cricketers
Wellington cricketers
North Island cricketers